Perseus and Andromeda is a 1622 painting in the Hermitage Museum by the Flemish artist Peter Paul Rubens of the ancient Greek myth of Perseus and Andromeda after the former's defeat of the Gorgon.  The composition is similar to that of an earlier painting by Rubens, Perseus frees Andromeda (now Gemäldegalerie, Berlin).

Perseus, in the centre of the painting, is surrounded by three putti, one holding the shield with Gorgon's reflection, one wearing the hero's helmet, while the third holds the winged horse Tobiano Pegasus. Above, Victory, the goddess of glory, is depicted in the act of placing a crown on the hero's head. Two other putti free Andromeda from the rock to which she is tied.  Cetus, the sea monster defeated by the hero, is shown below.

This painting probably remained in Rubens' house until his death; an engraving from 1684, depicting the facade of Rubens' house in Antwerp, shows the painting through the window of the second floor. In the summer of 1769 the painting was acquired by the Russian Hermitage Museum from the collections of Heinrich von Brühl. It is now housed in the Rubens Hall on the second floor of the Hermitage Museum.

References

Other versions by Rubens

Mythological paintings by Peter Paul Rubens
Paintings of Andromeda
Paintings in the collection of the Hermitage Museum
1620s paintings